Bananaman is a fictional character appearing in British comic books. Bananaman is a parody of traditional superheroes, being portrayed as a schoolboy who is transformed into a muscled, caped adult man when he eats a banana. The character originally appeared in Nutty as the back page strip in Issue 1, dated 16 February 1980 drawn by John Geering. 

He has since appeared in The Dandy and The Beano.

Original strip
The original strip, by Dave Donaldson and Steve Bright, written and developed by the latter, and mostly drawn by John Geering until his death in 1999, is essentially a parody of Superman and Batman with elements of Captain Marvel and his British twin, Marvelman, and occasionally other Silver Age characters, while also combining comic slapstick with a heavy dose of eccentric British humour similar to Alan Moore's contemporary work on Captain Britain.

After John Geering died in 1999, Barrie Appleby took over and later Tom Paterson. In 2003, the original scriptwriter, Steve Bright drew it, until 2007. Sporadically from 2007 to 2010 the character appeared in reprinted strips from the John Geering era. For a short time, in the end of 2008, artist Chris McGhie reinvented Bananaman in a series of new strips. 

McGhie's other work included The Three Bears for The Beano (in 2002) and the characters on Yoplait's 'Wildlife' product range. Two new strips drawn by Barrie Appleby appeared that year as well.

Following the Dandy revamp of October 2010, Wayne Thompson took over drawing Bananaman in a style reminiscent of French cartoonist Lisa Mandel, a popular artist in The Dandy who had previously drawn Jak, Agent Dog 2-Zero and, occasionally, Bully Beef and Chips. 

In Issue 3515, Thompson's style changed notably, becoming more cartoonish and detailed. As of spring 2011, Thompson's version of Bananaman appears in full colour over two pages. From 1983 to 1986, Bananaman also had his own annual. This was unusual because, unlike many other comics at the time, Nutty never had an annual. 

Unlike Dennis the Menace and Bash Street Kids, which mostly consisted of reprints, all the material in these annuals was new. In Issue 3618, dated 14 January 2012, Bananaman made his debut appearance, as John Geering reprints, in The Beano, however he continued to appear in The Dandy. Another Beano character, Bananagirl of Super School, was revealed to be his cousin.

The Dandy print comic ended in December 2012, but Bananaman was still seen in the digital version drawn by Andy Janes. New Bananaman strips drawn by Wayne Thompson and written by Nigel Auchterlounie, Kev F Sutherland and lately Cavan Scott continue to run in The Beano through 2014. 

In 2016, writing duties for the strip were taken over by Tommy Donbavand and Danny Pearson, since 2018, Bananaman has been written by Ned Hartley.

Character
In the strip, Eric Wimp, an ordinary schoolboy living at 29 Acacia Road, Nuttytown (later changed to Dandytown and then Beanotown when the strip moved to other comics), eats a banana to transform into Bananaman, an adult superhero, sporting a distinctive cowled blue and yellow outfit complete with a yellow two tailed cape resembling a banana skin. 

His superpowers include the ability to fly, superhuman strength (often quoted as "twenty men... twenty big men" but sometimes limitless, with "nerks", "women" and "snowmen" all being used in place of "men"), and seeming invulnerability. 

This is offset by the fact that he is just as naive and foolish (if not more so) as his alter ego; as mentioned in the comic once or twice, he has the "muscles of twenty men and the brains of twenty mussels".

If Bananaman needs extra power, bananas can be eaten for strength boosts, provided by his faithful pet crow; if he does not have enough strength to shatter an ice block, for example, after eating another banana, he will have enough. If he eats many bananas in one sitting, he quickly becomes obese in his transformation; if he eats bananas that are not full, he transforms with extra weight in the lower part of his body. 

There have also been comics where he has eaten a variant on normal bananas, and transforms differently, reflecting the difference in that banana. The effects of eating the bananas are not consistent from story to story. In one Beano issue with Eric unable to find a banana, he resorted to drinking banana milk, becoming a liquid, totally useless version of Bananaman who later in the story is mopped up by a janitor.

Varying origins
Eric Wimp was rocketed to Earth from the moon as a baby, and gained his powers because the crescent moon resembles a banana. Bananaman resembles Superman in having a kryptonite style weakness to mouldy bananas, and a Fortress of Solitude style building at the North Pole, made out of a giant banana. 

During early board meetings, the designers thought of having Bananagirl accompany the series. The girl would have been called Margaret Wimp, and be the "sister" of Eric. This idea was scrapped later on in production, because the concept of two children being related without parents would be too far fetched for children to understand; however, the idea was revived for a Beano comic strip.

In the 1991 Dandy Annual, Bananaman's origin was changed to that of being a normal Earth baby in a maternity hospital, who obtained his powers after unintentionally eating a banana in which General Blight had hidden a stolen supply of 'Saturnium', and accidentally left it next to Eric. However, later issues referred to the first origin as the real one.

Other characters
Bananaman initially faced a different pastiche supervillain each week, who were often lampoons of the kind of single issue, uncreatively named villains that heroes fought during the Silver Age, or tips of the hat to famous supervillains. Bananaman's arch enemy is General Blight, a parody of Adolf Hitler and generic criminal mastermind who in later strips largely replaced the criminal of the week. 

Other villains included mad scientist Doctor Gloom, Bananaman's evil fruit counterpart Appleman, the mischief making Weatherman and dessert fiend Captain Cream.

Eric's punk style shaved head was replaced by a more typical 1980s style haircut, Bananaman gained a talking crow sidekick called simply Crow, and Bananaman became so stupid he often forgot how to fly or to use the door. Eventually, Bananaman even began to go to school despite being an adult.

Bananaman is allied with Chief O'Reilly, a stereotyped Irish policeman (apparently in homage to Batman's James Gordon or the equally stereotyped Chief O'Hara in the 1960s Batman television series). He used to wear an Indian feather headdress as a visual pun on Chief, and in later strips wore a hat with a flashing blue light on the top. 

Chief works in a police station shaped like a giant police helmet, which frequently has to be rebuilt after Bananaman accidentally destroys it. O'Reilly rings up Eric to get him to talk to Bananaman, presumably thinking Eric is Bananaman's assistant of some kind, as in the cartoon series it is made clear that the Chief is not aware of Eric's being the superhero.

Television cartoon series

From 1983 to 1986, the BBC aired a cartoon series based on Bananaman and featuring the voices of the members of The Goodies. It was produced by 101 Productions. Parts of the character were changed for the series: he was now called Eric Twinge, had a distinctive banana shaped hairstyle rather than punk stubble, and had a love interest (only when transformed) in the form of Fiona, a newsreader based on Selina Scott and also a possible homage to Lois Lane.

Graeme Garden (incorrectly credited as Greame Garden on some episodes) voiced the characters of Bananaman, General Blight and Maurice of The Heavy Mob, Bill Oddie voiced the characters of Crow, Chief O'Reilly, Doctor Gloom and the Weatherman, and Tim Brooke-Taylor voiced the characters of Eric, King Zorg of the Nerks, Eddie the Gent, Auntie, and Appleman, as well as narrating the episodes. 

Jill Shilling voiced Fiona and any additional female characters, including Eric's cousin Samantha (but not Auntie). The programme lasted for forty episodes between 3 October 1983 and 15 April 1986.

Bananaman was aired in the United States by the Nickelodeon cable network, as a companion piece to Danger Mouse, but Bananaman never came close to reaching that series' American popularity. The show also aired during the Australian Broadcasting Corporation's (ABC) after school timeslot, and is considered one of the Classic ABC shows.

In 1997, some episodes of Bananaman were used on the cartoon series The Pepe and Paco Show, created by Henson International Television.

Some of these episodes would eventually reappear in print form in The Dandy in 1998, coinciding with the BBC repeating the series that year, and were reprinted in the comic in the spring of 2007, now promoting the DVD. Each episode was roughly five minutes from start to end. Phrases from the show, "twenty big men" and "ever alert for the call to action", are still used in the comic today.

On 22 February 2021, FOX Entertainment announced that they would be producing a new Bananaman series with Bento Box Entertainment.

Film adaptation
In March 2014, it was announced that DC Thomson, in conjunction with Elstree Studio Productions, would be producing a movie on Bananaman, with a release date in 2015. In May 2014, DC Thomson unveiled the first teaser poster for the film. By September 2015, the official website stated "coming soon" instead of 2015. In September 2015, it was announced that the movie was in the early stages.

In January 2016, the Bananaman musical's page on Facebook posted that the movie adaptation is now in development, saying "This fruitiest of superheroes is experiencing a revival elsewhere – Bananaman The Movie is also in development". However, a release date was not mentioned.

On 8 June 2016, the now newly formed Beano Studios issued a press release. In the release it was noted that Beano Studios was formed to bring their properties to life through television, film and live performances based upon present projects which were being worked on. "Beano Studios is currently also exploring plans to take Beano characters to the bigger screens and stages worldwide." 

Though not specifically referenced, it can be assumed that this newly formed studio would take charge of the Bananaman movie, which had had no developments since the beginning of 2016. By June 2017, the official site had been removed. As the film never came in 2015 as promised, it is likely the film has been cancelled.

Musical production
Near the beginning of January 2016, it was reported that Bananaman would be turned into a musical for West End. An industry launch took place on 2 February 2016, showcasing the musical. The musical had a run from the end of 2017 to the beginning of 2018, at the Southwark Playhouse in London. It is unknown if it will be produced worldwide.

References

External links
International Hero
 Official Bananaman movie website

British comics characters
Bananas in popular culture
DC Thomson Comics strips
1980 comics debuts
British superheroes
Comics characters introduced in 1980
Parody superheroes
Superhero comics
Parody comics
Fictional anthropomorphic characters
Male characters in comics
Comics characters with superhuman strength
Fruit and vegetable characters
Dandy strips
Beano strips
Superheroes with alter egos
Rapid human age change in fiction